Cotachena aluensis is a moth in the family Crambidae. It was described by Arthur Gardiner Butler in 1887. It is found in the Solomon Islands and in Australia, where it has been recorded from Queensland.

References

Moths described in 1887
Spilomelinae